Knyagininsky Uyezd (Княгининский уезд) was one of the subdivisions of the Nizhny Novgorod Governorate of the Russian Empire. It was situated in the central part of the governorate. Its administrative centre was Knyaginino.

Demographics
At the time of the Russian Empire Census of 1897, Knyagininsky Uyezd had a population of 106,191. Of these, 98.0% spoke Russian and 1.9% Tatar as their native language.

References

 
Uezds of Nizhny Novgorod Governorate
Nizhny Novgorod Governorate